Adore Life is the second studio album by the English post-punk band Savages, released on 22 January 2016. The album was also nominated for the 2016 Mercury Prize, the band's second consecutive nomination after Silence Yourself was nominated for the prize in 2013.

Music and style
Adore Life drew comparison once again to Siouxsie Sioux. Financial Times wrote: "Beth sings with imposing control: even the words she utters with a wild yelp, à la Siouxsie Sioux, seem purposely unleashed". Critic Ludovic Hunter-Tilney described the music as, "Distorted guitars set up flayed layers of sound, backed by sinewy drums and bass".

Critical reception

Adore Life received widespread critical acclaim upon its release. At Metacritic, which assigns a normalised rating out of 100 to reviews from mainstream critics, the album received an average score of 82, based on 33 reviews, indicating "universal acclaim". In a favourable review, Paste said that Adore Life was still inspired by Savages' first influences while adding, it  "builds on that sound, and frames it in a contemporary context that is less throwback than thrilling". In a 3.5 out of 5 review, Rolling Stone wrote that "their music is driven by emotions that are almost unprecedented in the [post-punk] genre".

Accolades

Track listing

Personnel
Savages
 Jehnny Beth – vocals
 Gemma Thompson – guitar
 Ayse Hassan – bass guitar
 Fay Milton – drums

Technical
 Johnny Hostile – production
 Trentemøller – mixing
 John Davis – mastering
 Richard Woodcraft – engineering

Artwork
 Craig Ward – design, logo

Chart positions

References

2016 albums
Matador Records albums
Savages (band) albums